Walter R. Stallard (September 6, 1890 – death date unknown) was an American Negro league pitcher in the 1910s.

A native of St. Paul, Minnesota, Stallard made his Negro leagues debut in 1911 with the St. Paul Colored Gophers. He went on to play for the Indianapolis ABCs in 1913.

References

External links
Baseball statistics and player information from Baseball-Reference Black Baseball Stats and Seamheads

1890 births
Year of death missing
Place of death missing
Indianapolis ABCs players
St. Paul Colored Gophers players
Baseball pitchers
Baseball players from Minnesota
People from Saint Paul, Minnesota